Afghanistan competed at the 2008 Summer Paralympics in Beijing, China. The country was represented by a single athlete, Mohammad Fahim Rahimi, who competed in powerlifting.

Powerlifting

Men

See also
Afghanistan at the Paralympics
Afghanistan at the 2008 Summer Olympics

External links
International Paralympic Committee

References 

Nations at the 2008 Summer Paralympics
2008
Summer Paralympics